Josiah Barber (1771 – 10 Dec 1842) was the first mayor of Ohio City, Ohio. He was elected in 1836.

Early years
Barber was the son of Captain Stephen and Alice (Cass) Barber.

Development in Ohio
In 1809, Barber received a portion of the last division of Western Reserve lands along with his father-in-law Samuel Lord and his brother-in-law Richard Lord. They received land along the western border of the Cuyahoga River to the lake. They sold the land with Lord & Barber Realty Co. He constructed the first brick house in Cleveland at Pearl (W. 25th) and Franklin. In 1840, he and his partners set aside a portion of land for an open-air market that became the West Side Market. Then, in 1834 he was among the people who incorporated the Cuyahoga Steam Furnace Company.

Politics
Barber was appointed as a circuit judge in 1834 and then became the first elected mayor of Ohio City. He was the vice-president of the Cuyahoga County Colonization Society and he favored gradual abolition of slavery and colonization of blacks to either Africa or South America.

Personal life
Barber married two times. First, he married Abigail Gilbert and they had a daughter, Abigail G. Later, he married Sophia Lord and they had four children: Epiphras, Harriet, Sophia L., and Jerusha. Barber died in Cleveland.

Barber was initially interred at the Monroe Street Cemetery. He was disinterred in 1882 by his son, Josiah Barber Jr., and moved to Riverside Cemetery in Cleveland. The younger Barber had co-founded Riverside.

References

1771 births
1842 deaths
Mayors of places in Ohio
19th-century American businesspeople
Businesspeople from Ohio
People from Cuyahoga County, Ohio
Burials at Monroe Street Cemetery